Texas Proposition 2 may refer to various ballot measures in Texas, including:

2005 Texas Proposition 2
2007 Texas Proposition 2
2021 Texas Proposition 2